Tari Maate Once More is a 2018 Gujarati musical comedy-drama starring veteran Gujarati actor Bharat Chawda in the lead role, Janki Bodiwala in a supporting role, Ojas Rawal, Hemangiomas Dave, Jolly Rathod, Meera Acharya and Ragi Jani. The film is directed by Saurin Chaoudhary, and produced by Namrata Agrawal from Kushal Entertainment. Hiren Bhojak created the music and Rhythm Bhojak created the concept and writing. The nationwide release was by Rupam Entertainment.

Plot 
It is a triangle love story with much humorous situational comedy and much masti masala content. There is a suspense, romance, comedy, drama, melodrama, aggression, problems at one situation. There are six friends Mihir, Tara, Aaisha, Jaddu, Maggie and Harry. Mihir and Aaisha love each other but Tara loves Mihir. Unfortunately somehow Mihir proposed to Tara instead of Aaisha. There was a huge misunderstanding. After two years Mihir and Tara are going to get engaged with each other because Mihir doesn't want to hurt Tara's emotions and feelings. Due to funny incident Mihir and Tara's engagement got cancelled and all friends met again. They planned for Goa trip again, where Mihir and Aaisha attracted with each other and fall in love.

Cast 
 Bharat Chawda as Mihir
 Janki Bodiwala as Aaisha
 Ojas Rawal as Magi
 Shraddha Dangar as Jaadu
 Hemang Dave as Harry
 Jolly Rathod as Tara 
 Meera Acharya as Shailja 
 Ragi Jani as Don bhai

Production

Development 
The film is produced Namrata Agrawal from Kushal Entertainment (a division of Kushal Limited). The story and concept are by Rhytham Bhojak. Hiren Bhojak is music director of the film. Tari Maate Once More ropes in big Bollywood singers such as Shaan_(singer), Freedom Sharma, Vinod Shinde, and Hiren Bhojak. The film's negative rights have been sold to shemaroo Entertainment and available to watch on Shemaroo Me

Filming 
Shooting of the film started in post June 2017. The shooting is said to set in some parts of Ahmedabad and Goa in India.

Music 
The soundtrack of the album is composed by Hiren Bhojak with lyrics written by Hiren Bhojak and Kamini Shah. The soundtrack album consists of four tracks. The film's three songs were released by Zee_Music_Company.

Soundtrack

Hiren Bhojak has composed the music of this film. Lyrics of the tracks were written by Hiren Bhojak and Kamini Shah. Music label for the film is Zee_Music_Company

References 

2018 films
Films shot in India
Films set in Ahmedabad
Films shot in Ahmedabad
Films shot in Gujarat
Films shot in Goa
2010s Gujarati-language films